Gillian Sanders (born 15 October 1981) is a South African triathlete. She grew up in Pietermaritzburg, and took up triathlon in her youth under the influence of her father and older sister, who both competed in the sport. After competing internationally in age group and junior competition Sanders put her triathlon career on hold whilst studying law at Stellenbosch University, where she competed as a 1500m runner. She resumed triathlon competition after graduating, combining it with legal work. Sanders chose to focus on full-time competition at the end of 2011. She competed in the Women's event at the 2012 Summer Olympics.

She competed in the women's triathlon at the 2020 Summer Olympics.

References

External links
 

1981 births
Living people
South African female triathletes
Olympic triathletes of South Africa
Triathletes at the 2012 Summer Olympics
Triathletes at the 2016 Summer Olympics
Sportspeople from Johannesburg
Triathletes at the 2014 Commonwealth Games
Stellenbosch University alumni
Commonwealth Games medallists in triathlon
Commonwealth Games silver medallists for South Africa
Triathletes at the 2018 Commonwealth Games
Triathletes at the 2020 Summer Olympics
20th-century South African women
21st-century South African women
Medallists at the 2014 Commonwealth Games